"Vocation" is a poem written by Rabindranath Tagore. It echoes a child's ever-changing dreams for the future, the search for a vocation.

Plot
The poem describes a child's longing for the immense freedom he sees in the lives of those around him. When the gong sounds ten in the morning, he walks to his school and sees a great hawker crying "Bangles, crystal bangles!" and he wishes he could be a hawker. At four in the afternoon, while coming back from school, he sees a skillful gardener digging the ground and he wishes he were a gardener. When dusk falls his cruel mother sends him to bed and he sees an ever alert watchman through the window and he wishes he could be a watchman.

References

Poems by Rabindranath Tagore
Indian poems
1910s poems
Poems